Little Nicky is a 2000 platform video game based upon the Adam Sandler film of same name developed by Digital Eclipse and published by Ubisoft. Released for the Game Boy Color on November 17, 2000, the game features 19 levels (14 platforming levels and 5 mini-games) based on events from the film.

The video game was met with generally average reception.

Reception 

The game was met with average to mixed reception, as GameRankings gave it a score of 67.75%.

IGN gave it a rating of 8 out of 10. Reviewer Craig Harris said "the game adds a few cool elements to a very traditional genre" and praised the quality of the game's production and music but said "there are some places with spotty programming and awkward interfaces." By contrast, GameSpot gave it 4 out of 10, with reviewer Frank Provo calling the game "unpleasant."

References 

2000 video games
Game Boy Color games
English-language-only video games
North America-exclusive video games
Little Nicky (franchise)
Platform games
Video games based on films
Video games developed in the United States
Video games set in New York City
Game Boy Color-only games
Ubisoft games
Single-player video games
Digital Eclipse games